Jeremy Patzer  (born 26 March 1987) is a Canadian politician who was elected to represent the riding of Cypress Hills—Grasslands in the House of Commons of Canada in the 2019 Canadian federal election. He previously served on the board of the Conservative Party constituency association for the riding of Cypress Hills—Grasslands.

Patzer is the nephew of former MP David L. Anderson, his predecessor in this federal riding.

Electoral record

References

External links

Living people
Conservative Party of Canada MPs
Members of the House of Commons of Canada from Saskatchewan
People from Swift Current
Year of birth uncertain
1987 births